This is a list of notable events in the history of LGBT rights that took place in the year 1973.

Events

January 
 1 – Maryland becomes the first state to ban same-sex civil marriages. It does so by passing a statue restricting marriage to heterosexual couples.
27 – The Metropolitan Community Church's headquarters in Los Angeles is burned to the ground by an unknown assailant. No persons are inside of the building at the time of the fire.

April 
 22 – The first gay protest in Santiago, Chile was organised at Plaza de Armas.

June 
 24 – The UpStairs Lounge arson attack in the French Quarter of New Orleans kills 32 members of a Metropolitan Community Church congregation meeting.

August
 Pride Week 1973, the first major LGBT pride event in Canada, is held simultaneously in several Canadian cities.

October 
 10 – Following a lobbying campaign by the Gay Alliance Toward Equality, Toronto City Council adopts a policy forbidding discrimination on the basis of sexual orientation in municipal hiring, making the city the first jurisdiction in Canada to do so.

November
 5 – The Supreme Court of the United States in Wainwright v. Stone finds that the sodomy law of Florida is not unconstitutionally vague, reversing a Fifth Circuit ruling.
 9 – The Kentucky Court of Appeals rules in Jones v. Callahan that two women were properly denied a marriage license despite the gender neutrality of the state's marriage statute.

December
 13 – Washington, D.C.'s Title 34 makes discrimination on the basis of sexual orientation illegal.
 15 – The board of the American Psychiatric Association votes 13–0 to remove homosexuality from its official list of psychiatric disorders, the DSM-II. The resolution also urges an end to private and public discrimination and the repeal of laws discriminating against homosexuals.
 20 – The city council of New York City rejects a gay rights ordinance.
 21 – A United States federal judge issues a bulletin stating that the federal civil service may not terminate an employee based on sexual orientation alone.

See also

Timeline of LGBT history – timeline of events from 12,000 BCE to present
LGBT rights by country or territory – current legal status around the world
LGBT social movements

References

LGBT rights by year
1973 in LGBT history